The 1944 NCAA Track and Field Championships were contested at the 23rd annual NCAA-hosted track meet to determine the team and individual national champions of men's collegiate track and field events in the United States. This year's events were hosted by Marquette University at Marquette Stadium in Milwaukee, Wisconsin.

Illinois captured their third team championship (and first since 1927).

Team Result
Note: Top 10 finishers only
 (H) = Hosts

See also
 NCAA Men's Outdoor Track and Field Championship

References

NCAA Men's Outdoor Track and Field Championship
NCAA
NCAA